Hans Kary (born 23 February 1949) is a former professional tennis player from Austria.

During his career Kary won one singles title and three doubles titles. He achieved a career-high singles ranking of world no. 54 in 1976 and a career-high doubles ranking of world no. 124 in 1983.

Career finals

Singles (1 title, 1 runner-ups)

Doubles (3 titles, 1 runner-up)

External links
 
 
 

Austrian male tennis players
People from Spittal an der Drau District
1949 births
Living people
Sportspeople from Carinthia (state)